Inés Kaspers (born 7 February 1948) is a Dutch-born Spanish judoka who competed at international judo competitions. She was a four-time Spanish national champion, a European bronze medalist and was the first Spanish female judoka to compete at the first women's World Judo Championships in New York City.

Kaspers grew up in Amsterdam, she had a hard upbringing as her parents worked in the city's red light district. She left the Netherlands aged eighteen and emigrated to Spain where she married and gave birth to her son.

References

1948 births
Living people
Sportspeople from Amsterdam
Dutch emigrants to Spain
Spanish female judoka